During the 1941–42 English football season, Brentford competed in the London League, due to the cessation of competitive football for the duration of the Second World War. Despite scoring over 80 goals in what proved to be a forgettable league season, the Bees won the London War Cup with what was the club's only victory at the old Wembley Stadium.

Season summary

With the Second World War in full swing, the Football League's London clubs took a stand against the Football League and its upcoming regional competition for the 1941–42 season, citing the financial difficulties of raising a team during wartime and having to travel long distances to away matches. The rebel clubs broke away and competed in the London League during the 1941–42 season, which led to their expulsion from the Football League. Brentford began the season with a heavily depleted squad, with no goalkeeper available for the entirety of the season and just five of the club's 12 available outfield players made over 30 appearances during the 40-match campaign. Despite 16 goals in 19 appearances and 14 in 24 from returning guest forwards Eddie Perry and Douglas Hunt respectively, Brentford finished 9th of 16 teams in the London League. The team scored 80 goals, but the lack of a first team goalkeeper saw eight guests wear the jersey and concede 76 goals between them.

After finishing as runners-up in the previous season's London War Cup, attentions turned to the 1941–42 edition of the competition when the group stage kicked off on 21 March 1942. Aided by goals from all across the forward line, Brentford finished the group stage as unbeaten leaders. The Bees faced Arsenal in the semi-final at Stamford Bridge and drew 0–0. The two teams met again for the replay White Hart Lane a fortnight later, with goals from George Wilkins, Douglas Hunt and a late penalty save from John Jackson ensuring Brentford's passage through to the final versus Portsmouth. The two clubs faced off at Wembley Stadium on 30 May and a brace from Les Smith saw the Bees run out 2–0 winners, in what was the Bees' only victory at the old Wembley Stadium. The 69,792 crowd is still the largest attendance at any Brentford match. Brentford and Wolverhampton Wanderers met in a North versus South cup winners' charity match a week later, with the 1–1 draw at Stamford Bridge bringing an end to the 1941–42 season.

On the night of 1/2 March 1942, Percy Saunders, a pre-war Brentford player, was killed when his ship was torpedoed in the Indian Ocean. The inside forward had made his final appearance for the club in January 1940 and was serving as a sergeant in the 18th Divisional Workshops of the Royal Army Ordnance Corps. Saunders was the only former Brentford player to be killed in action during the Second World War.

League tables

London League

London War Cup Group 2

Results
Brentford's goal tally listed first.

Legend

London League

London War Cup

War Cup Winners' Match 

 Source: 100 Years Of Brentford

Playing squad 
 Players' ages are as of the opening day of the 1941–42 season.

 Sources: Timeless Bees, Football League Players' Records 1888 to 1939, 100 Years Of Brentford

Coaching staff

Statistics

Appearances and goals

Players listed in italics left the club mid-season.
Source: 100 Years Of Brentford

Goalscorers 

Players listed in italics left the club mid-season.
Source: 100 Years Of Brentford

Wartime international caps

Management

Summary

Transfers & loans 
Guest players' arrival and departure dates correspond to their first and last appearances of the season.

Notes

References 

Brentford F.C. seasons
Brentford